Al Odah v. United States is a court case filed by the Center for Constitutional Rights and co-counsels challenging the legality of the continued detention as enemy combatants of Guantanamo detainees. It was consolidated with Boumediene v. Bush (2008), which is the lead name of the decision.

The case was a continuation of the landmark Center for Constitutional Rights case Rasul v. Bush (2004). That decision determined that Guantanamo detainees had to be provided an opportunity before an impartial tribunal to challenge the grounds of their detention. Since that decision, Congress passed the Military Commissions Act of 2006, which restricted detainees from filing habeas corpus petitions in federal court.

Al Odah is an umbrella effort, incorporating sixteen habeas corpus petitions. It was consolidated under Boumediene v. Bush, which shared habeas issues. Oral arguments were heard by the Supreme Court on December 5, 2007, and was one of the most anticipated cases before the Court in its term.

The decision, striking down that provision of the Military Commissions Act of 2006, was handed down on 12 June 2008. The Supreme Court ruled that detainees can appeal habeas corpus in civilian federal courts.

Case History
Al Odah v. United States was originally filed by the Center for Constitutional Rights and co-counsel in April 2002 on behalf of twelve imprisoned Kuwaitis, including Fawzi Al Odah, seeking the right of habeas corpus. A government motion to dismiss the petition was granted on July 30, 2002, by Judge Colleen Kollar-Kotelly of the US District Court for D.C. The Center for Constitutional Rights appealed the case, which had been consolidated with the other two leading habeas corpus petitions, Rasul v. Bush and Habib v. Bush. On March 11, 2003, the D.C. Circuit Court of Appeals dismissed the case.

On November 10, 2003, the Supreme Court granted certiorari to the three leading habeas petitions, consolidated under the name Rasul v. Bush. On June 28, 2004, the Supreme Court issued a landmark decision on the subject of Guantanamo detainees. In Rasul v. Bush, the Court determined that with respect to Guantanamo, the right to habeas corpus does not depend on citizenship. This decision affirmed the jurisdiction of the U.S. court system over Guantanamo cases, as it ultimately had jurisdiction over the custodians of the detainees. It affirmed the right of detainees to challenge their detention before an impartial tribunal.  Following this decision, the Court remanded the habeas petitions to lower courts for decisions.

On July 7, 2004, the Department of Defense established Combatant Status Review Tribunals (CSRTs), military forums created as a substitute for the judicial process in U.S. civilian and military courts. The Bush administration has consistently asserted that the detainees at Guantanamo do not have the right to due process and established the CSRT process as an alternative to review charges and determine if detainees were to be classified as enemy combatants.

Following the establishment of the tribunals, the government filed motions to dismiss pending habeas corpus cases, on the basis that the cases should be heard by the CSRT system. The District Court Judge Richard J. Leon dismissed two cases assigned to him on this basis on January 19, 2005. Days later, on January 31, Judge Joyce Hens Green, who had been assigned in 2004 to coordinate all the habeas corpus petitions following the Rasul v. Bush decision, ruled that detainees are entitled to constitutional protections, and that the CSRT system is inadequate to the task.

On December 30, 2005, Congress passed the Detainee Treatment Act (DTA). In accordance with the Bush administration goals, the DTA removed Guantanamo habeas corpus cases from the jurisdiction of the US Circuit Court for D.C. and gave authority over these cases to the CSRT and military commission system set up by the Department of Defense.

In January 2006, government lawyers moved to dismiss pending habeas cases, arguing that the DTA should be applied retroactively. The affected cases included Al Odah and Boumediene at the US circuit court level, and Hamdan v. Rumsfeld at the level of the Supreme Court.

On June 29, 2006, the Supreme Court ruled in Hamdan that the DTA cannot be applied retroactively. It determined that the military commissions created by the executive branch violate both military law under the Uniform Code of Military Justice and the Geneva conventions, to which the US is signatory and incorporated them into law. It ruled that the executive branch did not have the authority to set up a separate judicial system. The Supreme Court decision meant that Boumediene and Al Odah could  continue in the U.S. civilian court system.
 
In response to the Hamdan ruling, Congress passed the Military Commissions Act of 2006 (MCA) to authorize a new form of military commissions; the president signed it on October 17, 2006. The MCA described the CSRT review process as a substitute for habeas proceedings in U.S. courts and excluded the judicial review of claims challenging detention by non-citizens determined by their CSRTs to be enemy combatants or to be awaiting such determination. On February 20, 2007, the US Court of Appeals for the District of Columbia ruled that the Boumediene and Al Odah plaintiffs, as non-citizens, were not entitled to habeas review due to the passage of the Military Commissions Act.

The Center for Constitutional Rights and its co-counsel appealed the consolidated cases to the Supreme Court. Initially, the Court refused to hear the case, advising attorneys and plaintiffs to exhaust the review process set up by the DTA. But, less than two months later, in its first reversal in 60 years, the Supreme Court agreed to hear the consolidated Boumediene and Al Odah case during the 2007–2008 term.

Commentators have speculated that a widely publicized insider condemnation in November 2007 of the CSRT system was the catalyst for the Supreme Court's reversal. Lieutenant Colonel Stephen Abraham, an Army Reserve officer who had been a panelist on a Combatant Status Review Tribunal, strongly criticized the process in a written affidavit of June 2007, saying that evidence was insufficient and that panelists had been pressured to find detainees were enemy combatants. He described the CSRT system as deeply flawed, saying that it relies on evidence that would not be permissible in a court of law and that it is designed to return a guilty verdict. Abraham submitted his affidavit to the Supreme Court on June 22, 2007, just days before the Court reversed its decision and added the Boumediene and Al Odah case to their 2007-2008 docket. Referring specifically to the Al Odah CSRT hearings, in which he participated, Abraham said, "What were purported to be specific statements of fact lacked even the most fundamental earmarks of objectively credible evidence."

The Supreme Court heard oral arguments on the case on December 5, 2007. Demonstrators dressed in detainee-like orange jumpsuits and black hoods assembled outside the building. The day in court was widely reported in the United States and international media.

Petitioners' and Respondents' briefs
The petitioners characterized the Guantanamo Bay detention camp as "an international symbol of the Executive branch's contempt for the rule of law and a deep stain on the reputation of the United States at home and abroad."  The petitioners' brief argues that the men at Guantanamo are entitled to habeas corpus, and that the Military Commission Act violates the Constitution's suspension clause. The brief argues that the Combatant Status Review Tribunals and Military Commissions do not satisfy the requirements of habeas corpus. The petitioners conclude that detainees should be given a "searching judicial review of the factual and legal bases for their detentions."

In their brief, the government respondents argue that the Military Commissions Act eliminated federal court jurisdiction over Guantanamo habeas petitions. In addition, the respondents' legal team submits that the Military Commissions Act does not violate the suspension clause and that the plaintiffs should exhaust the review system set up by the DTA before challenging its legitimacy.

Al Odah in the news
The Supreme Court hearing of the Boumediene v. Bush and Al Odah v. US case was widely recognized in the media as a serious test of the Bush administration's policy with regard to Guantanamo and detainee rights. Fox News described Boumediene v. Bush and Al Odah as "one of the highest-profile cases the Supreme Court will hear this year." The IPS reported that "the decision of the nine justices" on the Boumediene v. Bush and Al Odah case "could bring the entire administration's detention policy down in flames -- or not." The New York Times Editorial Board addressed the case in their October 23 editorial, "The Supreme Court Showdown of the Year." The Times said "it is important for the Supreme Court to make clear that the detainees have a constitutional right to have a judge determine whether they are being properly held." The Village Voice wrote on November 6 that "we will know by the end of the court's term next year whether this Supreme Court...will continue to enforce the essential American principle that none of us is above the law—not even the person who strides to the music of 'Hail to the Chief.'"

The New York Times previewed the December 5, 2007 oral arguments, saying that what is at stake in the case "is whether the Supreme Court itself will continue to have a role in defining the balance [of liberty versus security] or whether, as the administration first argued four years ago, the executive branch is to have the final word".

The Defense Department announced the transfer of Fawzi al-Odah to the Kuwaiti government. It wasn't immediately clear how Kuwait will handle al-Odah's case, including if he'll be freed totally.

Detainees whose cases were consolidated with al Odah v. U.S.

{| class="wikitable" border="1"
|+ 'Some cases amalgamated with al Odah v. U.S.
|-
| 065 || Omar Rajab Amin
|-
| 205 || Nasser Nijer Naser Al Mutairi
|-
| 213 || Khalid Abdullah Mishal Al Mutairi
|-
| 217 || Abdulaziz Sayer Owain Al Shammari
|-
| 220 || Abdullah Saleh Ali Al Ajmi
|-
| 228 || Abdullah Kamal Abdullah Kamal Al Kandari
|-
| 229 || Mohammed Funaitel Al Dihani
|-
| 232 || Fawzi Khalid Abdullah Fahad Al Odah
|-
| 551 || Fwad Mahmoud Al Rabiah
|-
| 552 || Fayiz Mohammed Ahmed Al Kandari
|-
| 568 || Adil Zamil Abdull Mohssin Al Zamil
|}

Military Commissions Act
The Military Commissions Act of 2006 mandated that Guantanamo captives were no longer entitled to access the US civil justice system, so all outstanding habeas corpus petitions were stayed.

Boumediene v. Bush
On June 12, 2008, the United States Supreme Court ruled, in Boumediene v. Bush, that the Military Commissions Act could not remove the right for Guantanamo captives to access the US Federal Court system. It said that all previous Guantanamo captives' habeas petitions were eligible to be re-instated.

On July 18, 2008 David J. Cynamon filed a "PETITIONERS' STATUS REPORT" in Al Odah, v. United States (Civil Action No. CV 02-0828 (CKK)) on behalf of Fawzi Khalid Abdullah Fahad Al Odah, Fayiz Mohammed Ahmen Al Kandari, Khalid Abdullah Mishal Al Mutairi, and Fouad Mahmoud Al Rabiah. He wrote that they were the four remaining Kuwaiti captives in Guantanamo, and that none of the four men had been cleared for release. He wrote that the government had completed "factual returns" for all four men—but those factual returns had contained redacted sections.

On 12 December 2008 DoJ official John Battaglia filed a "NOTICE OF SERVICE OF UNCLASSIFIED, PROTECTED FACTUAL RETURN"'' with regard to Faez Mohammed Ahmed al-Kandari (ISN 552) in Civil Action No. 02-CV-0828 (CKK). Battaglia sought to have the unclassified factual return designated as "protected information". He added: "Respondents, however, do not object to petitioner's counsel sharing the unclassified factual return with the petitioner-detainee in this case."

References

External links

Guantanamo captives' habeas corpus petitions
United States District Court for the District of Columbia cases
United States habeas corpus case law